{{Infobox military unit
| unit_name                     = Paramilitary Marine RegimentRoyal Thai Navy
| native_name                   = กรมทหารพรานนาวิกโยธินกองทัพเรือ
| image                         = Thahan Phran Patch.gif
| image_size                    = 200px
| caption                       = 
| dates                         = 1977–present
| country                       = Thailand
| allegiance                    = 
| branch                        =  Royal Thai Navy
| type                          = Marines Paramilitary Forces
| size                          = 1,622
| command_structure             =  Royal Thai Marine Corps
| garrison                      = Sattahip, Chonburi
| nickname                      = นักรบดำ (Black Warrior)เหยี่ยวดำ (Black Kite)ประดู่เหล็ก (Iron Flowers)
| patron                        = 
| motto                         = 
| colors                        = Black
| march                         = 
| mascot                        = Black Kite
| battles                       = * Cold War
 Communist insurgency in Thailand Communist insurgency in Malaysia
 Vietnamese border raids in Thailand
 Southern Insurgency| website                       = marines paramilitary
| current_commander             = 
| ceremonial_chief              = 
| colonel_of_the_regiment       = 
}}

The Paramilitary Marine Regiment, Royal Thai Navy or Thahan Phran Marines'''  ( is a Thahan Phran paramilitary light infantry force in the Royal Thai Marine Corps. It falls under the command of the Royal Thai Marine Corps, which has been approved in the establishment of the Ministry of Defence. It is considered to be the most powerful combat unit of the Royal Thai Marine Paramilitary Force.

History
The Paramilitary Marine Regiment was originally founded during the years 1977-1978 due to a serious threat from a terrorist attack during the Communist Insurgency. Especially along the border it was organized by the local population because of a perception problem in the area.

Royal Thai Armed Forces Headquarters has agreed to perform on June 21, 1978, Cabinet of Thailand including approved on July 18th, 1978 by the Royal Thai Army Special Operation Center 315, a control unit supervisor and training in Pak Chong, Nakhon Ratchasima.

After fighting to Communist Insurgency. Changed its mission to protect the country and Marine Corps need to expand accordingly. They include Troops are stationed Marines and volunteers.

Paramilitary Marine Regiment Was established in 2019 due to the Royal Thai Government and Internal Security Operations Command (ISOC) has reduced forces in tackling the unrest in South Thailand insurgency.

The Royal Thai Navy has approved the establishment of a Paramilitary Marine Regiment by The Cabinet of Thai on May 24, 2016 to coincide with the Royal Thai Marine Corps.

Organization
 Paramilitary Marine 16 Companies
 1st Female Paramilitary Marine 1 Platoon

Paramilitary Marine Regiment
 1st Paramilitary Marine Company
 2nd Paramilitary Marine Company 
 3rd Paramilitary Marine Company 
 4th Paramilitary Marine Company
 5th Paramilitary Marine Company
 6th Paramilitary Marine Company
 7th Paramilitary Marine Company
 8th Paramilitary Marine Company
 9th Paramilitary Marine Company 
 10th Paramilitary Marine Company
 11th Paramilitary Marine Company
 12th Paramilitary Marine Company
 13th Paramilitary Marine Company
 14th Paramilitary Marine Company
 15th Paramilitary Marine Company
 16th Paramilitary Marine Company 
 1st Female Paramilitary Marine Platoon

Weapons

Small arms

References

External links

Military units and formations of Thailand
Royal Thai Navy
Military units and formations established in 1977
Military units and formations established in 2016